Maeva or Maëva is a feminine given name. Notable people with the name include:

Maëva Charbonnier (born 1991), French synchronized swimmer
Maëva Contion (born 1992), French hurdler
Maëva Coucke (born 1994), French model and Miss France 2018
Maeva Marcus, American historian
Maeva Sarrasin (born 1987), Swiss women's footballer

See also
3916 Maeva, a main-belt asteroid

French feminine given names